Hellbent on Compromise is an album by Scottish musician Edwyn Collins, released in 1990.

Critical reception
The Rough Guide to Rock wrote that the album "lacked its predecessor's tight, dense production, and its atmospherics too often gave way to an unsatisfactory sparseness."

Track listing
All tracks composed by Edwyn Collins; except where indicated
 "Means to an End" (Collins, Paul Quinn) - 5:12
 "You Poor Deluded Fool" - 4:54
 "It Might as Well Be You" - 3:25
 "Take Care of Yourself" - 6:43
 "Graciously" - 3:44
 "Someone Else Besides" - 4:35
 "My Girl Has Gone" (Marv Tarplin, Ronald White, William Robinson, Warren "Pete" Moore) - 3:44
 "Now That It's Love" - 3:27
 "Everything and More" - 4:58
 "What's the Big Idea?" - 4:57
 "Time of the Preacher/Long Time Gone" (Collins/Willie Nelson) - 5:05

Personnel
Edwyn Collins – guitar, vocals
John "Segs" Jennings – bass
Chris Taylor – drums, percussion
David Anderson – keyboards, guitar
Colin MacKenzie – bass
Trevor McCarty – bass
Chucho Merchán – double bass
Martin Drover – trumpet
Zop Cormorant - drums
Jock Loveband - backing vocals on "What's the Big Idea?"
Tyrone Berkeley - backing vocals on "Time of the Preacher/Long Time Gone"
Simeon Jones - harmonica on "Time of the Preacher/Long Time Gone"
David Robinson - cello on "Time of the Preacher/Long Time Gone"
Alan Titherington, Kirsten Morrison - violin on "Time of the Preacher/Long Time Gone"

References

1990 albums
Edwyn Collins albums
Albums produced by Edwyn Collins